Skunk City is a Syracuse, New York neighborhood that for a number of years has been known by this name, and before 1886 was a rural part of the Town of Geddes. The neighborhood boundaries are Geddes St. on the east, Grand Ave. and Burnet Park on the north, and West Onondaga St. on the south. Harbor Brook Retention area is to the west. The neighborhood owes its name to the unusually high number of skunks that roam the area at night.

References

External links
 A City With Too Much Housing; Syracuse Hopes to Clear Deserted Eyesores From Streets - A New York Times article focusing on Skunk City
 Syracuse Neighborhoods - City of Syracuse Website

Neighborhoods in Syracuse, New York